Mountfield is a small village in County Tyrone, Northern Ireland. It is within the townland of Aghalane, northeast of Omagh. It lies on the A505 road and had a population of 252 in the 2001 Census. It is set in a stretch of undulating countryside and is regarded as a gateway to the Sperrin Mountains.

The village was developed mainly in the 19th century by Sir William McMahon and today is a quiet, tranquil place with its economy dependent on agriculture.

Mountfield is part of the Omagh District Council area.

Sport 

Mountfield is the home of Mountfield F.C. Set up 2014, Mountfield is the home of Sperrin Óg Ladies Gaelic Football Club.

Notes

References 
NI Neighbourhood Information Service
Omagh District Council

See also 

List of towns and villages in Northern Ireland

Villages in County Tyrone